The Egypt national youth handball team is the national under–18 handball team of Egypt or in , nicknamed (The Pharaohs)  
(الفراعنة). Controlled by the Egyptian Handball Federation, it represents Egypt in international matches.

Youth Olympic Games 

 Champions   Runners up   Third place   Fourth place

World Championship record 
 Champions   Runners up   Third place   Fourth place

African Youth Championship
 Champions   Runners up   Third place   Fourth place

References

External links
World Men's Youth Championship table
European Men's Youth Championship table

 

Handball in Egypt
Men's national youth handball teams
Handball